Ana Isabel Medina Garrigues (born 31 July 1982) is a Spanish tennis coach and former professional player.

As a player she reached a career-high ranking of world No. 16 in 2020, and won 11 singles and 28 doubles titles, including the 2008 and 2009 French Open with Virginia Ruano Pascual. Like many of her Spanish compatriots, she was a clay-court specialist who grinds to win most of her rallies. However, unlike most of her fellow Spaniards, she preferred to play on hardcourts.
She won the WTA tournament in Strasbourg, beating Katarina Srebotnik in the final in May 2008, thus defending the title she won the previous year against Amélie Mauresmo. Her other singles titles came at Palermo in 2011, 2006, 2005, 2004 and 2001, at Canberra in 2006, Strasbourg in 2005 and Fès in 2009.

After retirement from singles tennis (she continues playing doubles) at the end of the 2014 season, Medina Garrigues became a professional coach, gaining success while working for Jeļena Ostapenko, who won the 2017 French Open Grand Slam title. In late 2017, she was named captain of Spain's Fed Cup team. She has also become tournament organizer at Valencia Open.

Career

2008
Together with Virginia Ruano Pascual, she won the French Open and the silver medal at the Beijing Olympics.

2011
Medina Garrigues began 2011 by losing in the first rounds of Auckland Open, Australian Open, and Copa Colsanitas and the qualifying draw of the Sydney International. She then reached her first semifinal in nine months in the Abierto Mexicano Telcel with wins over top seed Julia Görges and seventh seed Carla Suárez Navarro before losing to Gisela Dulko in straight sets. In the Indian Wells Open she defeated Tamira Paszek before losing to Maria Sharapova.

Garrigues then qualified for the Tournament of Champions and reached the final, but she was defeated by defending champion Ana Ivanovic in two sets.

2012
Medina Garrigues reached the quarterfinals of Sony Swedish Open in Båstad, but lost to Johanna Larsson.

2014
Medina Garrigues started 2014 at the Australian Open. She lost in the first round to lucky loser Irina Falconi.

At the PTT Pattaya Open, Medina Garrigues was defeated in the first round by Alison Riske without winning a single game. She announced that the French Open would be her last tournament before retiring from singles tennis, though she would continue to play doubles. Medina Garrigues lost in the second round of qualifying for the French Open to Tereza Smitková in two sets, ending her singles career.

2018
Medina Garrigues received a wildcard spot (via protected ranking) and entered the doubles competition at the Madrid Open, partnering fellow Spaniard Arantxa Parra Santonja. Then in August, she retired from professional tennis.

Performance timelines

Singles

Doubles

Significant finals

Grand Slam tournaments

Doubles: 2 titles

Olympic Games

Doubles: 1 silver medal

WTA Elite Trophy

Singles: 1 runner-up

Premier Mandatory & 5 tournaments

Doubles: 1 runner-up

WTA career finals

Singles: 18 (11 titles, 7 runner-ups)

Doubles: 45 (28 titles, 17 runner-ups)

ITF finals

Singles: 10 (6–4)

Doubles: 6 (3–3)

Team events

Hopman Cup (1–1)

Notes

References

External links

 
 
 
 
 
 
 

1982 births
Living people
People from Torrent, Valencia
Sportspeople from the Province of Valencia
Tennis players from the Valencian Community
Spanish female tennis players
Olympic tennis players of Spain
Tennis players at the 2004 Summer Olympics
Tennis players at the 2008 Summer Olympics
Tennis players at the 2012 Summer Olympics
Tennis players at the 2016 Summer Olympics
Olympic silver medalists for Spain
Olympic medalists in tennis
Hopman Cup competitors
French Open junior champions
French Open champions
Grand Slam (tennis) champions in women's doubles
Grand Slam (tennis) champions in girls' doubles
Medalists at the 2008 Summer Olympics
Spanish tennis coaches